Mount Charles Stewart is a mountain located in the Bow River valley of Banff National Park in Canada.

The mountain was named in 1928 after Charles Stewart, who served as Premier of Alberta from 1917 to 1921.

Geology

Mount Charles Stewart is composed of sedimentary rock laid down during the Precambrian to Jurassic periods. Formed in shallow seas, this sedimentary rock was pushed east and over the top of younger rock during the Laramide orogeny.

Climate

Based on the Köppen climate classification, Mount Charles Stewart is located in a subarctic climate with cold, snowy winters, and mild summers.

See also
Geography of Alberta
Anû Kathâ Îpa

References

External links
 

Mountains of Banff National Park
Two-thousanders of Alberta
Alberta's Rockies